Topeka is an incorporated town in Mason County, Illinois, United States. The population was 60 at the 2020 census.

Geography
Topeka is located in northern Mason County at  (40.329960, -89.931034).

Mason Creek, a west-flowing tributary of the Illinois River, passes just south of the town limits.

Demographics

As of the census of 2000, there were 90 people, 36 households, and 28 families residing in the town. The racial makeup of the town was 95.56% White, and 4.44% from two or more races.

There were 36 households, out of which 30.6% had children under the age of 18 living with them, 58.3% were married couples living together, 13.9% had a female householder with no husband present, and 22.2% were non-families. 16.7% of all households were made up of individuals, and 5.6% had someone living alone who was 65 years of age or older. The average household size was 2.50 and the average family size was 2.79.

In the town, the population was spread out, with 25.6% under the age of 18, 5.6% from 18 to 24, 32.2% from 25 to 44, 23.3% from 45 to 64, and 13.3% who were 65 years of age or older. The median age was 36 years. For every 100 females, there were 109.3 males. For every 100 females age 18 and over, there were 91.4 males.

The median income for a household in the town was $41,750, and the median income for a family was $46,875. Males had a median income of $45,938 versus $0 for females The per capita income for the town was $39,651. None of the population and none of the families were below the poverty line.

References

1869 establishments in Illinois
Populated places established in 1869
Towns in Mason County, Illinois
Towns in Illinois